Somerset is an unincorporated community in El Dorado County, California. Its ZIP Code is 95684.

Somerset is a rural town located at the junction of Bucks Bar Road, Grizzly Flat Road, and Mount Aukum Road.  The town has a small store, a realty office, the Gold Vine Grille, the Crossroads Cafe, a small storage facility, and a post office.

Most of the land in the Somerset area is divided into ten acre properties.  The main roads are asphalt but almost all of the other roads and driveways are dirt/rock.

The main business in the area comes from the wineries and wine tourism.

The post office was transferred from Youngs to Somerset in 1950. The first settlers came from Somerset, Ohio and named the place after their hometown.

References

Unincorporated communities in California
Unincorporated communities in El Dorado County, California